The Dabang River is a river in Guizhou Province, China. It rises in Tamu Mountain of northeastern Anshun and flows southward to join the Beipan River just south  of Fujiazhai in Guanling Buyei and Miao Autonomous County. The river has a length of 132 km and drains an area of 2,864 square km.

References

Rivers of Guizhou